Charles Hall Dillon (December 18, 1853 – September 15, 1929) was a member of the United States House of Representatives from South Dakota (1913–19). He later served on the South Dakota Supreme Court. He was born near Jasper, Indiana in 1853.

Early life and education
He attended the public schools, and received his undergraduate degree from Indiana University in 1854, with a graduate law degree two years later from Indiana University Maurer School of Law. He started his career as an attorney in Jasper, later moving to Marion, Iowa in 1881, to Mitchell, Dakota Territory, in 1882, and to Yankton, South Dakota in 1884.

Political career
He was first elected to the South Dakota State Senate in 1903, serving through 1911. He was a delegate to the Republican National Conventions in 1900 and 1908. In 1913, he won election to the United States House of Representatives, remaining in that capacity through 1918, when he lost the Republican primary for renomination to a fourth term. On April 5, 1917, he was one of 50 representatives who voted against declaring war on Germany. He returned to Yankton, moving in 1922 to Vermillion, South Dakota, after being made an associate justice of the South Dakota Supreme Court, where he remained until 1926.

He went on to seek election to the United States Senate, and retired from active political life in 1926. He died in Vermillion, South Dakota in 1929, aged 75. He is buried in the Yankton Cemetery.

Personal life
He married the daughter of Bartlett Tripp.

References

1853 births
1929 deaths
People from Dubois County, Indiana
Republican Party members of the United States House of Representatives from South Dakota
Republican Party South Dakota state senators
Justices of the South Dakota Supreme Court
Dillon, Charles H.
People from Vermillion, South Dakota
19th-century American lawyers
Indiana University alumni

Members of the United States House of Representatives from South Dakota